Fasa is an Iranian city.

Fasa or FASA may also refer to:
 FASA, an American publisher of role-playing games, wargames and boardgames
 FASA Studio or FASA Interactive, a spin-off videogame company
 Federated Ambulatory Surgery Association, a US nonprofit association representing the interests of ambulatory surgery centers (ASCs)
 Fasa County, a county in Fars province, Iran
 FASA-Renault, a former Spanish automobile manufacturing company

See also
 Fassa, a minor Christian-democratic political party in the province of Trentino, Italy